Your Honour is a style of address for judges.

Your Honour or Your Honor may also refer to:

 Your Honour (Indian TV series), a 2000 Indian television series
 Your Honor (South Korean TV series), a 2018 South Korean television series
 Your Honor (American TV series), a 2020 American television limited series

See also
Yes Your Honour, 2006 Malayalam film
In Your Honor, a studio 2005 double album by American rock band Foo Fighters